Sweden competed at the 1928 Summer Olympics in Amsterdam, Netherlands. 100 competitors, 87 men and 13 women, took part in 66 events in 11 sports.

Medalists

Athletics

Boxing

Men's Flyweight (– 50.8 kg)
 Lennart Bohman
 First Round — Bye
 Second Round — Lost to Hubert Ausbock (GER), points

Men's Heavyweight (+ 79.4 kg)
 Nils Ramm →   Silver Medal
 First Round — Bye
 Quarterfinals — Defeated Hans Schonrath (GER), points
 Semifinals — Defeated Sverre Sørsdal (NOR), points
 Final Match — Lost to Arturo Rodríguez (ARG), KO-1

Cycling

Four cyclists, all men, represented Sweden in 1928.

Individual road race
 Gösta Carlsson
 Erik Jansson
 Georg Johnsson
 Hjalmar Pettersson

Team road race
 Gösta Carlsson
 Erik Jansson
 Georg Johnsson
 Hjalmar Pettersson

Diving

Equestrian

Fencing

Eight fencers, six men and two women, represented Sweden in 1928.

Men's foil
 Bertil Uggla
 Ivar Tingdahl

Men's épée
 Nils Hellsten
 Gunnar Cederschiöld

Men's team épée
 Nils Hellsten, Sidney Stranne, Gunnar Cederschiöld, Bertil Uggla

Women's foil
 Ebba Gripenstedt
 Hanna Olsen

Modern pentathlon

Three male pentathletes represented Sweden in 1928. Bo Lindman won the silver medal and Sven Thofelt won the gold.

 Sven Thofelt
 Bo Lindman
 Ingvar Berg

Sailing

Men

Swimming

Weightlifting

Wrestling

References

1928 in Swedish sport
Nations at the 1928 Summer Olympics
1928